Anderson Silva (born 1975) is a Brazilian mixed martial artist.

Anderson Silva may also refer to:

Anderson Silva (kickboxer) (born 1986), Brazilian kickboxer and mixed martial artist
Anderson Silva (footballer) (born 1997), Brazilian footballer

See also
 Anderson da Silva (disambiguation)
 Anderson Soares da Silva (disambiguation)